The Battle of North West Six is the second album by the Keef Hartley Band. At the time, Hartley's six-piece group was appearing augmented with a brass section as The Keef Hartley Big Band, and a number of songs on the album feature this extended line-up.

Track listing

1969 LP
Deram SML 1054 (UK), DES 18035 (US)
 "The Dansette Kid / "Hartley Jam for Bread" (Fiona Hewitson, Spit James, Keef Hartley, Gary Thain) – 3:59
 "Don't Give Up" (Hewitson, James, Hartley, Thain) – 4:07
 "Me and My Woman" (Gene Barge) – 4:24
 "Hickory" (Hewitson, James, Hartley, Thain) – 2:45
 "Don't Be Afraid" (Hewitson, James, Hartley, Peter Dines, Thain) – 4:25
 "Not Foolish, Not Wise" (Hewitson, James, Hartley, Thain) – 3:56
 "Waiting Around" (Hewitson, Hartley, Thain) – 2:29
 "Tadpole" (Hewitson, Hartley, Thain) – 7:00
 "Poor Mabel (You're Just Like Me)"  (Hewitson, James, Hartley, Thain) – 3:08
 "Believe In You" (Hewitson, Hartley, Thain) – 5:23

Fiona Hewitson is Miller Anderson writing under his wife's name for contractual reasons.

1995 CD reissue
One Way Records OW 30333 
Same track listing as the 1969 LP

Personnel

Keef Hartley Band
 Keef Hartley – drums, percussion
 Miller Anderson – vocals, guitars (various)
 Henry Lowther – trumpet, flugelhorn, violin, brass arrangements
 Jim Jewell – tenor saxophone
 Gary Thain – bass guitar
 "Spit James" (real name: Ian Cruickshank) – guitar (Tracks 1 & 5)

Additional musicians
 Mick Weaver – organ, piano, percussion
 Mike Davis – trumpet
 Harry Beckett – trumpet, flugelhorn
 Lyn Dobson – tenor saxophone, flute
 Chris Mercer – tenor saxophone
 Barbara Thompson – baritone saxophone, flute
 Ray Warleigh – flute
 Mick Taylor – guitar (Track 10)

Technical
 Neil Slaven – producer
 Derek Varnals – engineer
 Adrian Martins, John Punter – assistant engineers
 Art Wood - artwork
 Richard Sacks - photography

References 

1969 albums
Keef Hartley Band albums
Deram Records albums